Pomacocha District may refer to:

 Pomacocha District, Acobamba
 Pomacocha District, Andahuaylas